Libellus de imperatoria potestate in urbe Roma is an anonymous Latin treatise on the authority of the Holy Roman Emperor in the city of Rome. It has been dated to between the late 9th century and the middle of the 10th. It was probably written at Spoleto. It survives in one manuscript, which was appended to the contemporary Chronicon of Benedict of Sant'Andrea.

The Libellus argues for the authority of the Holy Roman Emperor in the so-called "patrimony of Saint Peter". The author clearly sides with the Emperor Louis II against Pope Nicholas I. 

Ferdinand Gregorovius calls its author an "Imperialist" and a "partisan", and doubts the accuracy of his claim that "[the emperor's] legate resides in Rome at all times". According to Eleanor Duckett, the author of the Libellus "poured out his feelings into that interesting document".

Notes

References

Editions

Giuseppe Zucchetti, ed. Il Chronicon di Benedetto, monaco di S. Andrea del Soratte e il "Libellus de imperatoria potestate in urbe Roma", Fonti per la storia d'Italia, 55. Rome: 1920.
Georg Pertz, ed. "De imperatoria potestate in urbe Roma libellus", Mon. Germ. Hist. Scriptores, iii, 719–22.

Further reading

Ferdinand Hirsch, "Die Schenkung Kaiser Karls des Kahlen für Papst Johann VIII und der Libellus de imperatoria potestate in urbe Roma", Forschungen sur deutschen Geschichte, 20.
Marios Costambeys, Power and Patronage in the Early Medieval Italy: Local Society, Italian Politics, and the Abbey of Farfa, c.700–900. Cambridge: Cambridge University Press, 2007.

9th-century Latin books
10th-century Latin books
Political books
Papal States